Boselaphini is a tribe of bovines. It contains only two extant genera, each with a single extant species.

Description
The Boselaphini or four-horned antelope tribe are the last survivors of a form very similar to that of the ancestors of the broader subfamily. The oldest fossil members of the tribe, such as Eotragus, date to the Miocene about 18 to 20 million years ago. Such fossils possessed horns very similar to those of males belonging to the two living species, although in some cases, they were also present in females.

Both extant species have relatively primitive anatomical and behavioural characteristics and the females have no horns. They are native to the rapidly diminishing forests of India, and tend to avoid open plains. The nilgai has been introduced into southern Texas where a population of a little under 15,000 animals provides some long-term insurance for its survival.

Genera

Extant species

Phylogeny
The following are the genera classified under the tribe. Genera marked with † are extinct.

Tribe Boselaphini
 Boselaphus
Boselaphus tragocamelus - Nilgai or blue bull (not to be confused with the extinct bluebuck Hippotragus leucophaeus)
 †Elachistoceras
 †Duboisia
 †Dystychoceras
 †Eotragus
 †Kipsigicerus
 †Mesembriportax
 †Miotragocerus
 †Pachyportax
 †Perimia
 †Phronetragus
 †Pliodorcas
 †Plioportax
 †Proboselaphus
 †Protragocerus
 †Ruticeros
 †Samokeros
 †Selenoportax
 †Sivaportax
 †Sivoreas
 †Strogulognathus
 Tetracerus
 Tetracerus quadricornis - Four-horned antelope
 †Tragoportax
 †Tragoreas

References

Bovines
Mammals of India
Mammal tribes